The Jewish revolt against Constantius Gallus erupted during the Roman civil war of 350–353, upon destabilization across the Roman Empire. In 351–352 the Jews of Roman Palaestina revolted against the rule of Constantius Gallus, brother-in-law of Emperor Constantius II and Caesar of the eastern part of the Roman Empire. The revolt was crushed by Gallus' general Ursicinus.

Background

The emperor Constantius II, like his father Constantine the Great before him, showed a preference for the Christian religion, which he favored over all others, including Judaism. Unlike his father, however, Constantius allowed Christians to persecute the pagans and the Jews. Some Christian clergy practiced intolerance toward non-Christians, both through the secular arm and in directing angry crowds, which attacked and destroyed synagogues and temples.

Eventually, the Jews reacted, opposing Christian proselytism and showing intolerance toward Jewish Christians. Fiery sermons preached in synagogues against Edom were in fact directed against those Romans who, after removing the Jews' political independence, were now repressing their religion.

Revolt

Roman Civil War

In 350, Emperor Constantius II was engaged in a campaign in the East against the Sasanians. He was however forced to return to the West to counter the usurpation of Magnentius, who had murdered Constantius' brother and colleague, Constans. Constantius therefore appointed his cousin Gallus Caesar of the East, on March 15, 351 at Sirmium. Gallus arrived at Antioch, his capital, on May 7 of that same year. During the period between the passage of Constantius in the West and the arrival of Gallus in the East, or immediately after the arrival of the Caesar in Antioch, the Jews revolted in Palestine.

Hostilities in Galilee
The rebellion was led by Isaac of Diocaesarea (also known as Isaac of Sepphoris), aided by a certain Patricius, also known as Natrona, a name with messianic connotations, and had its epicentre in the town of Diocaesarea (the Greco-Roman referent for Sepphoris). Jerome records that the revolt began with a night assault on the Roman garrison, which was destroyed, and allowed the Jews to procure the necessary weapons. According to the 9th century author Theophanes the Confessor subsequently the rebels killed the people of different ethnicities, pagan Greek Hellenes and Samaritans. He is the first author to make this claim.

Ursicinus' campaign
In 351 or 352, Gallus sent his magister equitum Ursicinus to forcefully put down the revolt. Tiberias and Diospolis, two of the cities conquered by the rebels, were almost destroyed, while Diocaesarea was razed to the ground. Ursicinus also ordered several thousand rebels killed. According to Jerome, Gallus slew many thousands of people, including even those who were too young to fight. Sozomen, when recalling these events, wrote: "The Jews of Diocæsarea (Sepphoris) also took up arms and invaded the Roman garrisons in Palestine and the neighboring territories, with the design of shaking off the Roman yoke. On hearing of their insurrection, Gallus Caesar, who was then in Antioch, sent troops against them, defeated them, and destroyed Diocæsarea." A midrash suggests that Patricius was killed in the battle.

Aftermath

After the events, a permanent garrison occupied Galilee.

See also
Samaritan revolts
Jewish revolt against Heraclius

Notes

References

Primary sources 
Socrates Scholasticus, Historia ecclesiastica
Sozomen, Historia ecclesiastica
Theophanes the Confessor, Chronographia

Secondary sources 
 Thomas M. Banchich, "Gallus Caesar (15 March 351 – 354 A.D.)", De Imperatoribus Romanis, 1997.
 Bernard Lazare and Robert Wistrich, Antisemitism: Its History and Causes, University of Nebraska Press, 1995, .
 "Patricius", Jewish Encyclopedia

351
352
350s conflicts
350s in the Roman Empire
4th-century Judaism
4th-century rebellions
Constantinian dynasty
Jewish rebellions